Hertzina is an extinct genus of conodonts in the family Furnishinidae. Fossils can be found in the Wheeler Shale Cambrian (c. 507 Mya) fossil locality in Utah, United States.

References

External links 

 
 

Paraconodontida
Conodont genera
Cambrian conodonts
Fossils of the United States
Extinct animals of Utah
Wheeler Shale
Paleozoic life of Nova Scotia

Cambrian genus extinctions